Wollomombi River, a perennial stream of the Macleay River catchment, is located in the Northern Tablelands district of New South Wales, Australia.

Course and features
Wollomombi River rises on the eastern slopes of Chandlers Peak in the Great Dividing Range, southeast of Guyra, and flows generally southerly, joined by one minor tributary and tumbling over the Wollomombi Falls before reaching its confluence with the Chandler River, near the village of Wollomombi, south of the Cunnawarra National Park, within the Oxley Wild Rivers National Park. The river descends  over its  course; through a number of spectacular gorges and waterfalls in the Oxley Wild Rivers National Park.

At the Wollomombi Falls lookout there are scenic gorge rim walks and a steep track that takes you down to the Chandler River.

History
In December 1904 two teenagers were drowned while bathing in the Wollomombi River. Another lady almost drowned while attempting to rescue them.

Beef cattle and sheep are reared on the upper reaches of the river.

See also

 List of rivers of Australia
 Rivers of New South Wales

References

External links
 

 

Rivers of New South Wales
Northern Tablelands